The Gildencroft Quaker Cemetery is a historic cemetery in Chatham Street, Norwich, Norfolk, England, where many of the city's Quakers were buried including the writer Amelia Opie. Many members of the Gurney family – who had a major influence on the development of Norwich – are buried here. The family founded Gurney's Bank.

As of 2009, access to the cemetery is limited to regular business hours.

See also
 Rosary Cemetery, Norwich

References

External links
 Photograph of the Cemetery
 News report Retrieved 26 March 2009
 Quaker history in Norwich Retrieved 19 October 2009
 

Norwich
Cemeteries in Norfolk
Religion in Norfolk
Quaker cemeteries